Bang Rajan is a 2000 Thai historical drama film depicting the battles of the Siamese village of Bang Rachan (alternate spelling) against the Burmese invaders in 1767, as remembered in popular Thai culture. Cross-checking the story with the events reported by the Burmese sources indicates that the purported events at Bang Rachan are likely a merger of at least two independent events that took place in the war.

The film was directed and co-written by Thanit Jitnukul. In 2004, the film was "presented" by Oliver Stone in a limited release in US cinemas.

Plot
The Burmese army is seeking to invade Ayutthaya to block the invasion in Bang Rachan. The forces are at first led by Nai Taen, who is injured in an early battle. They use all their resources to prepare the village for a siege, including melting down all available metal farming implements into a crudely constructed cannon. Lacking horses, the village drunkard, Nai Thongmen, mounts an old water buffalo and rides the draft animal into battle.

Historical accuracy

The plot follows the Thai version of events. According to Thai tradition, the Burmese northern invasion army led by Gen. Ne Myo Thihapate was held up for five months at Bang Rachan, a small village northwest of Ayutthaya by a group of simple villagers. However, not all the points of this traditional Thai story could be true as the entire northern campaign took just over five months (mid-August 1765 to late January 1766), and the northern army was still stuck in Phitsanulok, in north-central Siam, as late as December 1765. Burmese sources do mention "petty chiefs" stalling the northern army's advance but it was early in the campaign along the Wang River in northern Siam (not near Ayutthaya) during the rainy season (August–October 1765). The Burmese general who was actually stationed near Ayutthaya was not Thihapate but rather Maha Nawrahta, whose southern army was waiting for the northern army to show up to attack the Siamese capital. It appears that the three verified events—petty chiefs resisting Thihapate in the north, Thihapate's campaign period of five months, and Maha Nawrahta staking out by Ayutthaya—have merged to create this popular mythology.

Cast
 Winai Kraibutr as Nai In
 Bin Binluerit as Nai Thongmen
 Jaran Ngamdee as Nai Chan Nuad Kheo
 Chumphorn Thepphithak as Nai Taen
 Bongkoj Khongmalai as E Sa
 Teerayut Pratchbamroon as Luang Por Dhammachote
 Suntri Maila-or as Nang Tang On

Production and reception
Bang Rajan was made on a budget of around 50 million baht, which is about four times the cost of other Thai productions being made at the time. It was a box-office hit in Thailand, earning more than 300 million baht.

The film was screened at several film festivals in 2001, including the Seattle International Film Festival, Toronto International Film Festival, the Vancouver International Film Festival, and the Hawaii International Film Festival. At the Asia Pacific Film Festival, it won for best art direction. It was screen at the Fantasia Festival in Montreal in 2003, where it won second prize for Best Asian Film.

The Battle of Bang Rajan was also depicted in a 1966 Thai film, starring Sombat Metanee in a role that won him a best actor honors at the "Golden Doll" Awards. The award was personally handed to Sombat by King Bhumibol Adulyadej.

The long-horned water buffalo featured in the film died of old age shortly after the film was released and was feted in a lavish funeral ceremony.

References

Bibliography

External links

2000 films
2000s war drama films
2000s historical films
Thai historical films
Thai-language films
Films set in 1767
Film Bangkok films
Thai national heritage films
2000 drama films